Relate is a charity providing relationship support throughout the United Kingdom. Services include counselling for couples, families, young people and individuals, sex therapy, mediation and training courses.  Relate also offers online services including webcam counselling and a therapeutic based LiveChat service.

It was founded in 1938 as the National Marriage Guidance Council, after a clergyman, Herbert Gray (1868-1956), noted that the divorce rate was increasing. Co-founders of the Council included the Methodist David Mace (1907-1990), the eugenicist Dr Edward Fyfe Griffith and Dr Eleanor Beatrice Schill MBE. The first funder of Relate was the British Eugenics Society.  Relate expanded after the Second World War with government funding secured from the Home Office and later the Lord Chancellor's Department in the late 1940s.  Relate celebrated its 75th birthday in 2013.  Relate holds an annual lecture with previous speakers including David Cameron, Deirdre Sanders, Nick Clegg, Alan Johnson, Charles Handy and Alain de Botton.

Relate adopted its current name on Valentine's Day 1988. In the 1990s, Relate's public profile increased after Princess Diana became its patron in 1989.  The current President of Relate is Prof. Janet Walker OBE.  Former Presidents of Relate include Professor Sir Cary Cooper and comedian and writer Ruby Wax.  The current Patrons of Relate are Tanya Byron and Bel Mooney. Current Vice President is Anjula Mutanda (elected 2018) and Author of How to do Relationships.Anjula Mutanda elected President of Relate November 2021.

Today, Relate sees over 150,000 clients a year, at more than 600 locations across the UK.  Relate is a federated charity with Relate Centres operating across England, Wales and Northern Ireland with its sister charity Relationships Scotland operating in Scotland.  In 2017, Relate merged a third of its Centres into the national charity in response to funding cuts.

In 2006, Relate opened the Relate Institute, the UK's first Centre of Excellence for the study of relationships, in partnership with Doncaster College and the University of Hull.  The Relate Institute closed in 2015. Baroness Tyler of Enfield was Chief Executive between 2007 and 2012 and was succeeded by Ruth Sutherland; Tyler is currently a Vice President of Relate. The current CEO is Aidan Jones.

Relate was a founding member of the Relationships Alliance which was launched in 2013 in partnership with OnePlusOne, Tavistock Relationships and Marriage Care.

Relationship books 

Other publications - Relate booklist

See also
 Loving kindness
 Marriage
 Outline of relationships
 Relationship education

References

External links
 
 Government funding stated in a written answer
 Obituary of Nicholas Tyndall (former chief of the organisation)
 BBC News 12/2/98 Why do couples argue?
 BBC News 3/8/2002 Spend more government money on counselling

Doncaster
Organisations based in South Yorkshire
Relationship counseling